Nause is a Swedish electro house and house music record production and DJ duo consisting of Jacob Criborn and Leonard Scheja.

Career 
They signed with Warner Music. In 2008, Nause was formed in Stockholm by Jacob Criborn, Kami Montgarde & Leonard Scheja. Their debut single hit "Made Of" was a big success on radio in Sweden and England. Nause is starring in the TV series "Heartbeats" on TV6. During the spring and summer of 2012, Nause went on a tour of Sweden.

Discography

Singles

Notes

Remixes
2013
Afrojack and Chris Brown - As Your Friend (Nause Remix)
Morten Breum - Larva (Far Away) (Nause Remix)

2012
Sway & Mr. Hudson - Charge (Nause Remix)
Eric Turner - Angels & Stars (Nause Remix)

2011
Rebecca & Fiona - Bullets (Adrian Lux & Nause Remix, Radio Edit)
Kaskade & Rebecca & Fiona - Turn It Down (Nause Remix)
Adrian Lux & Rebecca & Fiona - Boy (Nause Remix)
Kwan Hendry & SoulCream - Don't Give Up (Nause Remix)
David Morales & Jonathan Mendelsohn - You Just Don't Love Me (Nause Remix)
Britney Spears - Hold It Against Me (Adrian Lux & Nause Remix, Radio Edit)
Lazee, Adam Tensta, & Eric Turner - Young N Restless (Nause Remix)
Lazee, Madcon, & Julimar - Tag (Nause Remix, Radio Edit)

2010
Rebecca & Fiona - Luminary Ones (Nause Remix)
Tiësto - Feel It In My Bones (Nause Remix)
TheElement - Sultan of Soul (Nause Remix)
TheElement - Give Uz Dat (Nause Remix)

2009
Deadmau5 - Strobe (Nause Remix)

External links
Official website

References

Swedish house musicians
Swedish DJs
Electronic dance music DJs